Victoria Airport  is an airport serving Victoria, a town in the Araucanía Region of Chile. The airport is on the southwest side of the town.

See also

Transport in Chile
List of airports in Chile

References

External links
Victoria Airport at OpenStreetMap
Victoria Airport at OurAirports

Victoria Airport at FallingRain

Airports in Chile
Airports in La Araucanía Region